Hemilienardia hersilia is a species of sea snail, a marine gastropod mollusk in the family Raphitomidae.

Description
The length of the shell attains 3.5 mm, its diameter 1.7 mm.

(Original description) The small shell is ovate-pointed and contacted at the sutures and at the base. Its colour is dull-white, with an opaque white band at the back of the body  whorl. The shell contains 7 whorls, of which three are apical. Sculpture:—The radials are  discontinuous, vertical, moderately prominent ribs, which diminish at the sutures and vanish on the base, and are set at ten to a whorl. The spirals are prominent cords which override the ribs, four on the penultimate whorl and twelve on the body whorl. Of these the anterior five run across the snout and are beaded. The Apertureis sinuate. The  varix is composed of a double rib, the free limb traversed by eight spirals and the edge armed by four tubercles, becoming larger as they ascend, the lowest double. The columella shows two deep-seated plications. The  sinus and the siphonal canal are broad and shallow.

Distribution
This marine species is endemic to Australia and occurs off Queensland. It has also been found in the Western Indian Ocean.

References

 Powell, A.W.B. 1966. The molluscan families Speightiidae and Turridae, an evaluation of the valid taxa, both Recent and fossil, with list of characteristic species. Bulletin of the Auckland Institute and Museum. Auckland, New Zealand 5: 1–184, pls 1–23 
 Wiedrick S.G. (2017). Aberrant geomorphological affinities in four conoidean gastropod genera, Clathurella Carpenter, 1857 (Clathurellidae), Lienardia Jousseaume, 1884 (Clathurellidae), Etrema Hedley, 1918 (Clathurellidae) and Hemilienardia Boettger, 1895 (Raphitomidae), with the description of fourteen new Hemilienardia species from the Indo-Pacific. The Festivus. special issue: 2-45.

External links
 Gastropods.com: Hemilienardia hersilia
 

hersilia
Gastropods described in 1922
Gastropods of Australia